Pa Va (stylized as Pa..Va and also known as Pappanekkurichum Varkeyekkurichum) is a 2016 Indian Malayalam existential  comedy drama film directed by Sooraj Tom in his directorial debut. It stars Murali Gopy and Anoop Menon in the lead roles as two octogenarian friends. It is produced by Siyad Muhammed under his home production banner Safa Entertainment.

The movie narrates the love and friendship shared between two close friends, Devassy Paappan (Murali Gopi) and Perianthanam Varkichan (Anoop Menon) who can't do without each other despite being chalk and cheese personalities.  The film was released on 22 July 2016.

Plot
It focuses on existential aspects of life through two close octogenarian friends Pulimoottil Devassy Pappen and Periyanthaanam Varkey. Pappen is a planter who shares his good moments with jackfruit loving, retired Indian Army Brigadier and antique collector Varkey. Both of them are prosperous and well-settled, with  an unmarried Pappen living with his loving sisters and their families in Konnayi, and Varkey enjoying retired life with his wife in Murikkel, with their children abroad. One day Pappen shares his fear of dying to Varkey, but Varkey blends the concern with humor and encourages him. Soon after, Varkey dies from what he loves the most - a jackfruit falls over him. Varkey's death disturbs Pappen. Pappen sees Varkey in his dreams and starts to see him and talk to him in daytime. Pappen's loving sisters and his male help Kunju takes care of him. Pappen feels his and his family's interment should be at his hometown church in Murikkel with his ancestors and friend Varkey. But his current church in Konnayi doesn't agree with it under the fear of losing a wealthy family and an economic source that could affect the church in this transition. Pappen has dreams and thoughts about a girl whom he and Varkey had pined over but had passed away in her youth. Pappen under Varkey's spirit's interest goes on to find whom their love interest liked the most finds out painfully she was interested in evangelism. Pappen visits Varkey's house to meet his wife and learns she is moving to America to join her children and Varkey's coveted antiques are considered as silly objects like used to dry clothes and such. The church committee and the priests do their best to block Pappen's move towards his hometown church. Meanwhile, Pappen falls sick and is in Comma. This motivates his family members to buy Pappen's ancestor's land in his hometown and a burial plot in the hometown church cemetery. The priest of Pappen's current church who is motivated by financial interests and fame is visited by Varkey's spirit for not allowing Pappen's request. The priest signs the permission letter and dies from the shock and is seen laughing in spirit form with Varkey, pondering over his absurdity while he lived. Pappen wakes up from his Comma and the family happily transfers to his hometown church. However, he does what the priest wished to do for fame and dedicates it to the priest. Some time later, Pappen dies and is met with Varkey in heaven. And they both plan to cross the barriers between them and their love interest in heaven using their wit and strength of friendship.

Cast 

 Murali Gopy as Pulimoottil Devassy Pappen
 Anoop Menon as Periyanthaanam Varkey,retired Brigadier, (Indian Army)
 Indrans as Kunju
 Kaviyoor Ponnamma as Agnes/Sister amma, Pappen's 1st younger sister
 KPAC Lalitha as Annamma, Pappen's 2nd younger sister
 Ponnamma Babu as Theyyamma, Pappen's 3rd sister
 Vanitha Krishnachandran as Elamma, Pappen's 4th sister
 Ranjini as Lillykutty, Pappen's 5th sister
 Muthumani as Kunjumol, Pappen's youngest sister
 Bhagyalakshmi as Filomena/Filo, Varkey's wife
 Jose as Jose Achayan , Lillykkutty's husband
 Renji Panicker as Thampuran Johnny
 Ashokan as Chackochan
 P Balachandran as Father Micheal Kallayi (Kallayi Achan), priest of Pappen's current church
 Shammi Thilakan as Father Ittiparamban , priest of Pappen's hometown church
 Jagannatha Varma as Bishop
 Sunil Sukhada as Brother Paili, Theyyamma's husband
 Edavela Babu as Brother Paul, Theyyamma's son
 Jomon K John as Edwin
Sethulakshmi as Ammini
Eloor George  as Konnayi Kapiyar 
Arya as Sister Emily, Elamma's daughter
Ramu as Dr.Mathew, Elamma's husband
Santhosh as Thommi 
Chali Pala as Francis 
Shiju as George 
Arun Sidharth as Young pappen
Akash Pathmakumar as Young varkey
Aparna as Mary's friend
 Pauly Valsan as Pulimoottil housemaid
 Alexander Prashanth as Gregory
Cherthala Lalitha as Mother Superior 
Kozhikode Sharada as Thresia 
Naseer Sankranthi as Jr. Priest
Ajay as Josutty
Anish as MLA
Kalabhavan Rahman as Subinspector 
PK Unnikrishnan as Beeranikka
Purushan Kottayam as Jose
Kottayam Manju as Jose' wife Kunjumol 
Anjana Appukuttan as Nurse
 Prayaga Martin as Mary, Pappen & Varkey's love interest (cameo appearance)

Soundtrack
Music: Anand Madhusoodanan, Lyrics: Santhosh Varma, Suku Damodar, Rafeeq Ahammed, Harinarayanan.

 "Podimeesa" - P. Jayachandran
 "Vinnil Theliyum" - Vijay Yesudas, Aparna Balamurali
 "Innu Njan Pokum" - Murali Gopy
 "Pavakku Bhoomiyil" - Sithara Krishnakumar
 "Kalyanam Kalyanam" - Minmini, P. K. Nithin
 "De Ithennatha" - Swarna Vinayan

"Podimeesa" became a track in top ten charts of 2016.

Release

On 10 June 2016, a trailer was released on YouTube with a release date set for Ramadan 2016. However, due to competition from other releases, the film was postponed, and was finally released on 22 July 2016.

References

External links
 
 http://www.m3db.com/film/59981

2010s Malayalam-language films
Films directed by Sooraj Tom